El Cerro de Andévalo is a town and municipality located in the province of Huelva, Spain. According to the 2005 census, the municipality has a population of 2,636 inhabitants.

References

External links
 El Cerro de Andévalo

Cerro de Andevalo, el